The Cooper-Climax T55 is a Formula One car built by the Cooper Car Company for the 1961 Formula One season. Its best result was third-place for Bruce McLaren at the 1961 Italian Grand Prix.

Development
The T55 was a stop-gap development of the Cooper T53 for the start of the 1961 Formula One season, pending the introduction of a new chassis to take the Climax FWMV V8 for the new 1.5 litre formula. Smaller and lighter than the T53, it was powered by the  naturally aspirated Coventry-Climax FPF four-cylinder engine driving through a new Cooper six-speed gearbox.

Racing history
The T55 debuted at the non-championship 1961 Aintree 200. Jack Brabham and Bruce McLaren finished first and second, and Brabham set fastest lap. However, it would be unable to match the power of the new Ferrari 156 in the World Championship events, where McLaren's third place at Monza would be its best result. Cooper would finish fourth in the Constructors' championship.

The works team continued with the T55 at the start of 1962, along with the V8-powered T60, primarily driven by Brabham's replacement Tony Maggs, although McLaren used it in some non-championship events. John Love then obtained one of the cars and campaigned with it in several South African events, including its last World Championship appearance at the 1965 South African Grand Prix.

Complete Formula One World Championship results

 Points were awarded on an 8-6-4-3-2-1 (1961) and 9-6-4-3-2-1 (1962 onwards) basis to the first six finishers at each round, but only the best placed car for each make was eligible to score points. In 1961 and 1962 only the best five results from the season were retained, and only the best six results for 1963 and 1965.
 Includes points scored by other Cooper-Climax models
 All points scored by other Cooper-Climax models

References

Cooper Formula One cars